Yasemin Adar (born 6 December 1991) is a Turkish freestyle wrestler competing in the 76 kg division. She is a two-time World champion and five-time European champion. She also won one of the bronze medals in the women's 76 kg event at the 2020 Summer Olympics in Tokyo, Japan.

Private life
Yasemin Adar was born to Naim Adar, a baker, and Ayşegül in Balıkesir, Turkey on 6 December 1991. She has an elder sister, Yıldız. Her mother died in 2013. After finishing Gaziosmanpaşa High School, she studied physical education and sports in Balıkesir University. Currently, she works as a teacher in Niğde. On September 26, 2021, she married Erdem Yiğit.

Sports career
Adar was discovered by former Turkish champion sport wrestler Aslan Seyhanlı while she was performing shot put during her high school and university years. She then switched over to wrestling in her hometown. She competes for Trakya Birlik SK.

Adar took part in the freestyle −72 kg event at the 2012 World Championships in Strathcona County, Alberta, Canada, gaining no success.

She participated at the 2013 European Championships in Tbilisi, Georgia, without having success. At the 2013 Mediterranean Games in Mersin, Turkey, she became gold medalist in the −72 kg division. She placed fifth at the 2013 World Championships held in Budapest, Hungary, after losing to Chinese Zhang Fengliu in the semifinals and to American Adeline Gray in the third place match.

Adar reached the round of 16 at the 2014 World Championships in Tashkent, Uzbekistan.

She failed to advance to the finals after losing to Russian Ekaterina Bukina in the −75 kg event at the 2015 European Games in Baku, Azerbaijan. She then lost to Moldavian Svetlana Saenko in the bronze medal match. At the 2015 World Championships in Las Vegas, United States, Adar lost in the quarter finals to Colombian Andrea Olaya by fall.

Competing in the −75 kg event at the 2016 European Championships held in Riga, Latvia, she won her country's first-ever women's wrestling gold medal at this championship, defeating Russian Alena Storodubtseva.

In 2020, she won the silver medal in the women's 76 kg event at the 2020 Individual Wrestling World Cup held in Belgrade, Serbia. In March 2021, she competed at the European Qualification Tournament in Budapest, Hungary hoping to qualify for the 2020 Summer Olympics in Tokyo, Japan. She was eliminated in her second match by Martina Kuenz of Austria. In May 2021, she qualified at the World Olympic Qualification Tournament to represent Turkey at the 2020 Summer Olympics.

She won the gold medal in the women's 76 kg event at the 2022 European Wrestling Championships held in Budapest, Hungary. A few months later, she won the gold medal in the 76 kg event at the 2022 Mediterranean Games held in Oran, Algeria. Yasemin Adar beat Egypt’s Samar Amer 6-0 in women's freestyle 76 kg at the 2022 World Wrestling Championships in Belgrade, Serbia, scoring her second gold in the tournament.

Achievements

References

External links 
 

1991 births
Sportspeople from Balıkesir
Balıkesir University alumni
Turkish schoolteachers
Turkish female sport wrestlers
European Games competitors for Turkey
Wrestlers at the 2015 European Games
European champions for Turkey
Living people
Wrestlers at the 2016 Summer Olympics
Olympic wrestlers of Turkey
Mediterranean Games gold medalists for Turkey
Competitors at the 2013 Mediterranean Games
Competitors at the 2022 Mediterranean Games
World Wrestling Championships medalists
Mediterranean Games medalists in wrestling
European Wrestling Champions
Islamic Solidarity Games medalists in wrestling
Islamic Solidarity Games competitors for Turkey
Wrestlers at the 2020 Summer Olympics
Olympic bronze medalists for Turkey
Medalists at the 2020 Summer Olympics
Olympic medalists in wrestling
20th-century Turkish sportswomen
21st-century Turkish sportswomen